Kromm is a surname. Notable people with the surname include:

Bobby Kromm (1928–2010), Canadian ice hockey player
Daniella Kromm (born 2004), German rhythmic gymnast
Richard Kromm (born 1964), Canadian-born American ice hockey player
Robert Kromm (born 1984), German volleyball player

See also
Fromm